Cercospora mangiferae is a fungal plant pathogen.

References

mangiferae
Fungal plant pathogens and diseases
Fungi described in 1907